

Events

January
 January 1 – In Malaysia and Singapore, clocks are adjusted to the same time zone, UTC+8 (GMT+8.00).
 January 13 – Air Florida Flight 90 crashes shortly after takeoff into the 14th Street Bridge in Washington, D.C., United States, then falls into the Potomac River, killing 78 people.
 January 18 – 1982 Thunderbirds Indian Springs Diamond Crash: Four Northrop T-38 aircraft of the United States Air Force crash at Indian Springs Air Force Auxiliary Field, Nevada, killing all 4 pilots.
 January 26
 Mauno Koivisto is elected President of Finland.
 Unemployment in the United Kingdom increases by 129,918 to 3,070,621, a post-war record number.
 January 27 – The Garret FitzGerald government of the Republic of Ireland is defeated 82–81 on its budget; the 22nd Dáil Éireann is dissolved.
 January 30 – The first computer virus, the Elk Cloner, written by 15-year old Rich Skrenta, is found. It infects Apple II computers via floppy disk.

February
 February 1 – Senegal and The Gambia form a loose Senegambia Confederation.
 February 2 – The Hama massacre begins in Syria.
 February 3 – Syrian president Hafez al-Assad orders the army to purge the city of Harran of the Muslim Brotherhood.
 February 5 – London-based Laker Airways collapses, leaving 6,000 stranded passengers and debts of $270 million.
 February 7 – Iraqi club Al-Shorta win the 1982 Arab Club Champions Cup with a 4–2 aggregate win over Al-Nejmeh in the final.
 February 9 – Japan Airlines Flight 350 crashes in Tokyo Bay due to thrust reversal on approach to Tokyo International Airport, killing 24 among the 174 people on board.
 February 15 – The oil platform Ocean Ranger sinks during a storm off the coast of Newfoundland, killing all 84 rig workers aboard.
 February 18 – The Republic of Ireland general election gives a boost to Fianna Fáil.
 February 24 – In South Africa, 22 National Party MPs led by Andries Treurnicht vote for no confidence in P. W. Botha.
 February 25 – The European Court of Human Rights rules that teachers who cane, belt or tawse children against the wishes of their parents are in breach of the Human Rights Convention.

March 
 March 2 – Decentralisation in France: Law of Decentralisation creates the administrative regions of France (régions).
 March 9 – Charles Haughey becomes Taoiseach of the Republic of Ireland.
 March 10
 The United States places an embargo on Libyan oil imports, alleging Libyan state-sponsored terrorism.
 Syzygy: All 9 planets recognized at this time align on the same side of the Sun.
 March 16 – Claus von Bülow is found guilty of the attempted murder of his wife by a court in Newport, Rhode Island.
 March 18 – A legal case brought by Mary Whitehouse against the National Theatre of Britain concerning alleged obscenity in the play The Romans in Britain ends after the Attorney General intervenes.
 March 19 – Argentine scrap metal workers (infiltrated by marines) raise the flag of Argentina on South Georgia and the Falkland Islands, two British overseas territories.
 March 24 – Hussain Muhammad Ershad seizes power in Bangladesh.
 March 29
 Royal Assent is given to the Canada Act 1982, setting the stage for the repatriation of the Canadian Constitution on April 17.
 The 54th Academy Awards, hosted by Johnny Carson, are held at the Dorothy Chandler Pavilion in Los Angeles. Chariots of Fire wins Best Picture and 3 other Academy Awards.

April
 April 1 – The 1982 invasion of the Falkland Islands begins when Argentine forces land near Stanley, beginning the Falklands War.
 April 2 – Rex Hunt, the British governor of the Falkland Islands, surrenders the islands to Argentine forces, leading to their occupation.
 April 3 – Invasion of the Falkland Islands: Argentine forces begin the invasion of South Georgia.
 April 17 – Canadian Charter of Rights and Freedoms: By Proclamation of the Queen of Canada on Parliament Hill, Canada patriates its constitution, gaining full political independence from the United Kingdom; included is the country's first entrenched bill of rights.
 April 24 – German singer Nicole wins the Eurovision Song Contest 1982 (held in Britain) with the song Ein Bisschen Frieden.
 April 25 – Israel completes its withdrawal from the Sinai Peninsula in accordance with the Egypt–Israel peace treaty of 1979.
 April 26 – Falklands War: British troops retake South Georgia Island during Operation Paraquet.
 April 30 – The Bijon Setu massacre takes place in broad daylight at a railway crossing in India.

May

 May 1 – A crowd of over 100,000 attends the first day of the 1982 World's Fair in Knoxville, Tennessee, which is kicked off with an address by President Ronald Reagan. Over 11 million people attend during its 6-month run.
 May 2
 Falklands War: The British nuclear submarine  sinks the Argentine cruiser General Belgrano, killing 323 sailors. Operation Algeciras, an attempt to destroy a Royal Navy warship in Gibraltar, fails.
 The Weather Channel airs on cable television in the United States as the first 24-hour all weather network.
 May 4 – Falklands War:  is hit by an Argentine Exocet missile and burns out of control; 20 sailors are killed. The ship sinks on May 10.
 May 8 – French-Canadian racing driver Gilles Villeneuve is killed during qualifying for the 1982 Belgian Grand Prix.
 May 12 – Spanish priest Juan María Fernández y Krohn tries to stab Pope John Paul II with a bayonet during the latter's pilgrimage to the shrine at Fátima.
 May 16 – The New York Islanders sweep the Vancouver Canucks in four games to win the 1982 Stanley Cup Finals in ice hockey.
 May 18 – Falklands War: The British Special Air Service launches Operation Plum Duff, a reconnaissance mission preliminary to Operation Mikado, which is planned to destroy three Argentinean Exocet missiles and five Super Étendard fighter-bombers. Both Operation Plum Duff and Operation Mikado are called off after the Plum Duff insertion is revealed by a helicopter landing in Chile.
 May 21 
 Falklands War:  is sunk by Argentine aircraft, killing 22 sailors.
 The International Maritime Organization (IMO) is established.
 May 23 – Falklands War:  is lost.
 May 24
 Iranian troops retake Khorramshahr.
 KGB head Yuri Andropov is appointed to the Secretariat of the Communist Party of the Soviet Union.
 May 26 – Aston Villa F.C. wins the European Cup, beating Bayern Munich 1–0 after a 69th-minute goal by Peter Withe in Rotterdam.
 May 28 – 29 – Falklands War: Battle of Goose Green: British forces defeat a larger Argentine force.
 May 30
 Spain becomes the 16th member of NATO and the first nation to enter the alliance since West Germany's admission in 1955.
 Indianapolis 500: 1973 winner Gordon Johncock wins his second race over 1979 winner Rick Mears by 0.16 seconds. Leading to the closest finish to this date, Mears draws alongside Johncock with a lap remaining, after erasing a seemingly insurmountable advantage of more than 11 seconds in the final 10 laps, in what Indianapolis Motor Speedway historian Donald Davidson and Speedway public address announcer Tom Carnegie later call the greatest moment in the track's history.

June
 June 6 – The 1982 Lebanon War begins: Israeli forces under Defense Minister Ariel Sharon invade southern Lebanon in their "Operation Peace for the Galilee," eventually reaching as far north as the capital Beirut. The United Nations Security Council votes to demand that Israel withdraw its troops from Lebanon.
 June 8
 Falklands War: British supply ship RFA Sir Galahad is destroyed during the Bluff Cove Air Attacks
 VASP Flight 168, a Boeing 727 passenger jet, crashes into a forest hillside in Fortaleza in Brazil, killing 137.
The Los Angeles Lakers defeats the Philadelphia 76ers in six games to win the 1982 NBA Finals.
 June 11 – E.T.: The Extra-Terrestrial is released in the United States; this will become the biggest box-office hit for the next 11 years. 
 June 12 – The Nuclear Disarmament Rally, an event against nuclear weapon proliferation, draws 750,000 to New York City's Central Park. Jackson Browne, James Taylor, Bruce Springsteen and Linda Ronstadt attend. An international convocation at the Cathedral of St. John the Divine features prominent peace activists from around the world and afterward participants march on Fifth Avenue to Central Park for the rally.
 June 13
 The 1982 FIFA World Cup begins in Spain.
 Fahd becomes King of Saudi Arabia upon the death of his brother, Khalid.
 June 14 – Argentine surrender in the Falklands War: Argentine forces in the capital, Stanley, surrender to British forces.
 June 18 – Argentine military dictator Leopoldo Galtieri resigns in the wake of his country's defeat in the Falklands War.
 June 20 – Falklands War ends with British forces retaking the South Sandwich Islands.
 June 24 – British Airways Flight 9 suffers a temporary four-engine flameout and damage to the exterior of the plane after flying through the otherwise undetected volcanic ash plume from Indonesia's Mount Galunggung.

July
 July 4 – Four Iranian diplomats are kidnapped upon Israel's invasion of Lebanon.
 July 6 – A lunar eclipse (umbral duration 236 min and total duration 106 min, the longest of the 20th century) occurs.
 July 9 – Pan Am Flight 759 (Boeing 727) crashes in Kenner, Louisiana, killing all 146 on board and 8 on the ground.
 July 11 – Italy beats West Germany 3–1 to win the 1982 FIFA World Cup in Spain.
 July 16 – In New York City, the Reverend Sun Myung Moon is sentenced to 18 months in prison and fined $25,000 for tax fraud and conspiracy to obstruct justice.
 July 20 – Hyde Park and Regent's Park bombings: the Provisional IRA detonates 2 bombs in central London, killing 8 soldiers, wounding 47 people, and leading to the deaths of 7 horses.
 July 23
 The International Whaling Commission decides to end commercial whaling by 1985–1986.
 Torrential rain and mudslides in Nagasaki, Japan, destroy bridges and kill 299.
 Twilight Zone accident: During filming of Twilight Zone: The Movie, actor Vic Morrow and 2 child actors die in a helicopter stunt accident in California.
 July 31 – Beaune coach crash: In Beaune, France, 53 persons, 46 of them children, die in a highway accident (France's worst).

August 

 August 1 – Attempted coup against government of Daniel Arap Moi in Kenya.
 August 2 – The Helsinki Metro, the first rapid transit system of Finland, was opened to the general public.
 August 4 – The United Nations Security Council votes to censure Israel because its troops are still in Lebanon.
 August 7 – Italian Prime Minister Giovanni Spadolini resigns.
 August 12 – Mexico announces it is unable to pay its large foreign debt, triggering a debt crisis that quickly spreads throughout Latin America.
 August 13 – In Hong Kong, health warnings on cigarette packets are made statutory.
 August 17 – The first compact discs (CDs) are produced in Germany.
 August 20 – Lebanese Civil War: A multinational force lands in Beirut to oversee the PLO withdrawal from Lebanon.

September
 September 14 
 Lebanese President-elect Bachir Gemayel is assassinated in Beirut.
 Princess Grace of Monaco dies after having suffered a car crash a few days previously.
 September 18
A Lebanese Christian militia (the Phalange) kill thousands of Palestinians in the Sabra and Shatila refugee camps in West Beirut, the massacre is a response to the assassination of the president-elect, Bachir Gemayel four days earlier.
The funeral of Princess Grace of Monaco takes place
 September 19 – The first emoticons are posted by Scott Fahlman.
 September 21 
 The first International Day of Peace is proclaimed by the (United Nations).
 In the United States, the National Football League Players Association calls a strike, the first in-season work stoppage in the National Football League's 63-year history. The strike lasts for 57 days, reduces the regular season from 16 games to 9, and forces an expanded 16-team playoff tournament. 
 September 23 – Amine Gemayel, brother of Bachir, is elected president of Lebanon.
 September 24 – The Wimpy Operation, the first act of armed resistance against Israeli troops in Beirut.
 September 25 – In Israel, 400,000 marchers demand the resignation of Prime Minister Menachem Begin.
 September 26 – Thermals take Australian parachutist Rich Collins up to  during a jump; he almost blacks out due to lack of oxygen. He releases his main parachute to fall to a lower altitude and lands by his reserve parachute.
 September 29 The Chicago Tylenol murders occur when an unknown killer laced Tylenol with Potassium Cyanide that kills seven in Chicago, Illinois.

October 
 October 1
 Helmut Kohl replaces Helmut Schmidt as Chancellor of Germany through a constructive vote of no confidence.
 Sony launches the first consumer compact disc (CD) player (model CDP-101).
 October 8 
 Poland bans the Solidarity trade union after having suspended it on December 13, 1981.
 After six years in opposition, Social Democrat Olof Palme becomes once again Prime Minister of Sweden.
 October 11 – The Mary Rose, flagship of Henry VIII of England that sank in 1545, is raised from the Solent.
 October 20 – Luzhniki disaster: During the UEFA Cup match between FC Spartak Moscow and HFC Haarlem, 66 people are crushed to death.
 October 27 – In Canada, Dominion Day is officially renamed Canada Day.
 October 28 – The Socialist Party wins the election in Spain; Felipe González is elected Prime Minister.

November 
 November 3
 A gasoline or petrol tanker explodes in the Salang Tunnel in Afghanistan, killing at least 176 people.
 The Dow Jones Industrial Average surges 43.41 points, or 4.25%, to close at 1,065.49, its first all-time high in more than 9 years.
 November 6 – Cameroon president Ahmadou Ahidjo resigns, replaced by Paul Biya.
 November 8 – Kenan Evren becomes the seventh president of Turkey as a result of the constitution referendum. His former title was "head of state".
 November 11 – In Lebanon, the first Tyre headquarters bombing kills between 89 and 102 people.
 November 12 – In the Soviet Union, former KGB head Yuri Andropov is selected to become the general secretary of the Soviet Communist Party's Central Committee, succeeding the late Leonid I. Brezhnev who had died two days earlier.
 November 14 – The leader of Poland's outlawed Solidarity movement, Lech Wałęsa, is released from 11 months of internment near the Soviet border.
 November 20
The General Union of Ecuadorian Workers (UGTE) is founded.
University of California, Berkeley executes "The Play" in a college football game against Stanford. Completing a wacky 57-yard kickoff return that includes five laterals, Kevin Moen runs through Stanford band members who have prematurely come onto the field. His touchdown stands and California wins 25–20.
 November 24 – Representatives from 88 countries gather in Geneva to discuss world trade and ways to work toward aspects of free trade. 
 November 27 – Yasuhiro Nakasone becomes Prime Minister of Japan.
 November 28 
 The Edmonton Eskimos win an unprecedented 5th consecutive Grey Cup; a feat yet unaccomplished by any professional football franchise to win the 70th Grey Cup defeating the Toronto Argonauts 32–16.
 Al Ahly SC won the African Cup of Champions club (today known as the CAF Champions League) for the first time after defeating Ghanaian Asante Kotoko
 November 30 – Michael Jackson releases his sixth studio album, Thriller, in the United States, which will go on to be the best selling album of all time at 110 million units sold worldwide.

December 
 December 1 – Miguel de la Madrid takes office as President of Mexico.
 December 2 – At the University of Utah, 61-year-old retired dentist Barney Clark becomes the first person to receive a permanent artificial heart (he lives for 112 days with the device).
 December 4 – The People's Republic of China adopts its current constitution.
 December 7 – The first U.S. execution by lethal injection is carried out in Texas.
 December 8 – The December murders occur in Suriname.
 December 11 – Swedish pop group ABBA make their final public performance on the British TV programme The Late, Late Breakfast Show.
 December 13 – The 6.2  North Yemen earthquake shakes southwestern Yemen with a maximum Mercalli intensity of VIII (Severe), killing 2,800.
 December 16 – The United Freedom Front bombs an office of South African Airways in Elmont, NY and an IBM office in Harrison, NY. Two police officers suffer hearing damage. In March 1984, the UFF claims responsibility for the IBM building bombing, stating that the company was targeted because of its business in South Africa under Apartheid.
 December 22 – The Indian Ocean Commission (Commission de l'Océan Indien, COI) is created by the Port Louis Agreement.
 December 26 – Time magazine's Man of the Year is given, for the first time to a non-human, the computer.

Date unknown 
 The population of the People's Republic of China alone exceeds 1 billion, making China the first nation to have a population of more than a billion.
 A global surplus of crude oil causes gasoline prices to collapse.
 Ciabatta bread is invented by a baker in Verona, Italy.

Births

January 

 January 1 – David Nalbandian, Argentine tennis player
 January 4 – Kang Hye-jung, South Korean actress
 January 5
 Janica Kostelić, Croatian skier
 Vadims Vasiļevskis, Latvian javelin thrower
 January 6
 Gilbert Arenas, American basketball player
 Eddie Redmayne, English actor
 January 7
 Lauren Cohan, American actress 
 Ruth Negga, Irish actress 
 Hannah Stockbauer, German swimmer
 Camilo Villegas, Colombian golfer
 January 8 - Kim Jong Un, Supreme Leader Of North Korea.
 January 9 – Catherine, Princess of Wales, British princess
 January 13
 Guillermo Coria, Argentine tennis player
 Ruth Wilson, English actress
 January 14 – Víctor Valdés, Spanish football player
 January 15 
 Benjamin Agosto, American skater
 Emina Jahović, Serbian born-Turkish singer and actress
 January 17 – Dwyane Wade, American professional basketball player
 January 18 
 Marco Borriello, Italian footballer
 Joanna Newsom, American singer, harpist, pianist and songwriter
 January 19 – Pete Buttigieg, American politician and Presidential candidate (Mayor of South Bend, Indiana)
 January 20 – Pierre Webó, Cameroonian football player and coach
 January 21
 Nicolas Mahut, French tennis player
 Simon Rolfes, German footballer
 January 22 
 Sedef Avcı, Turkish actress and model
 Fabricio Coloccini, Argentine footballer
 Paula Pequeno, Brazilian volleyball player
 January 23 – Alexandru Jicul, Moldovan professional football player
 January 25 – Noemi, Italian singer
 January 28
 Camila Alves, Brazilian model and designer
 Mirtel Pohla, Estonian actress 
 Ainett Stephens, Venezuelan television personality/model
 January 29
 Adam Lambert, American singer
 Ernest Prakasa, Indonesian Comedian
 January 31 – Elena Paparizou, Greek-Swedish singer

February

 February 1 – Gavin Henson, Welsh rugby union player
 February 2 
 Katie Britt, American politician
 Filippo Magnini, Italian swimmer
 February 3
 Diego Acoglanis, Argentine footballer
 Vera Brezhneva, Ukrainian and Russian pop-singer and television presenter
 Bridget Regan, American actress
 February 4 – Tomas Vaitkus, Lithuanian professional road racing cyclist
 February 5 
 Rodrigo Palacio, Argentine footballer
 Jenn Suhr, American pole vaulter
 February 6 – Alice Eve, English actress
 February 7 – Nicola Spirig, Swiss triathlete
 February 8 – Zersenay Tadese, Eritrean long-distance track/road running athlete
 February 10
 Ayari Aoyama, Japanese swimmer
 Justin Gatlin, American athlete
 Mon Redee Sut Txi, Malaysian athlete
 February 11
 Natalie Dormer, English actress
 Neil Robertson, Australian snooker player
 February 12 – Carter Hayden, Canadian actor
 February 14 – Marián Gáborík, Czechoslovak (now Slovak) hockey player
 February 16 – Lupe Fiasco, American rapper
 February 17
 Adriano, Brazilian footballer
 Brooke D'Orsay, Canadian actress
 February 19 – Camelia Potec, Romanian swimmer
 February 25
 Chris Baird, Northern Irish footballer
 Maria Kanellis, American professional wrestler/model
 Bert McCracken, American singer (The Used)
 Flavia Pennetta, Italian tennis player
 February 26 – Li Na, Chinese tennis player
 February 27 – Bruno Soares, Brazilian tennis player
 February 28
 Verena Bentele, German Paralympic biathlete
 Natalia Vodianova, Russian model, actress and philanthropist

March 

 March 2
 Pilou Asbæk, Danish actor
 Kevin Kurányi, German soccer player
 Henrik Lundqvist, Swedish ice hockey player
 March 3 – Jessica Biel, American actress
 March 4
 Landon Donovan, American soccer player
 Hanna Hopko, Ukrainian politician
 March 5 – Daniel Carter, New Zealand rugby player
 March 6 – Stephen Jordan, English footballer
 March 8 
 David Lee, American volleyball player
 Kat Von D, American-Mexican tattoo artist
 March 9 
 Matt Bowen, Australian rugby league player 
 Mirjana Lučić-Baroni, Croatian tennis player
 March 10 – Thomas Middleditch, Canadian actor and screenwriter
 March 11 
 Thora Birch, American actress and producer
 Mircea Monroe, American actress and model
 March 13 
 Lina Länsberg, Swedish mixed martial artist, Kickboxer and Muai thai fighter
 Gisela Mota Ocampo, mayor of Temixco, Morelos, Mexico (d. 2016)
 March 15 
 Wilson Kipsang Kiprotich, Kenyan long-distance runner
 Daniel Richardsson, Swedish Olympic cross-country skier 
 March 17 – Steven Pienaar, South African footballer
 March 18 – Paola Cardullo, Italian volleyball player
 March 20 – Robbie Lawler, American mixed martial artist
 March 23 
 Tomasz Kuszczak, Polish football goalkeeper
 Adam Thomson, New Zealand rugby player
 March 25
 Danica Patrick, American race car driver
 Jenny Slate, American actress and comedian
 March 26 – Mikel Arteta, Spanish footballer and manager
 March 30
 Philippe Mexès, French footballer
 Javier Portillo, Spanish footballer
 March 31
 Tal Ben Haim, Israeli footballer
 Chloé Zhao, Chinese-American film director
Brian Tyree Henry, American actor

April

 April 1
 Andreas Thorkildsen, Norwegian javelin thrower
 Róbert Vittek, Slovak football player
 April 2 – David Ferrer, Spanish tennis player
 April 3 – Cobie Smulders, Canadian actress
 April 5
 Thomas Hitzlsperger, German director of football and former footballer
 Hayley Atwell, British-American actress
 April 9
 Jay Baruchel, Canadian actor and film director  
 Olímpio Cipriano, Angolan basketball player
 RedOne, Moroccan musician and producer
 April 10 – Chyler Leigh, American actress
 April 12 – Anna Sivkova, Russian fencer
 April 13 – Federico Crescentini, Sanmarinese football player (d. 2006)
 April 14 – Larissa França, Brazilian beach volleyball player
 April 15 – Seth Rogen, Canadian actor, comedian, film director and screenwriter
 April 16 – Gina Carano, American actress, television personality, fitness model and mixed martial artist
 April 17 – Tyron Woodley, American mixed martial artist
 April 18 
 Donna Feldman, American model and actress
 Scott Hartnell, Canadian hockey player
 April 19 – Ola Vigen Hattestad, Norwegian Olympic cross-country skier
 April 20 – Keiichiro Nagashima, Japanese speed skater
 April 22 – Kaká, Brazilian footballer
 April 23 – Kyle Beckerman, American footballer
 April 24 – Kelly Clarkson, American singer
 April 25 – Monty Panesar, English cricketer
 April 26 – Novlene Williams-Mills, Jamaica sprinter
 April 27 – Brian Gallant, Canadian politician, Premier of New Brunswick
 April 28 – Harry Shum Jr., Costa Rican-American dancer and actor
 April 30
 Lloyd Banks, American rapper
 Kirsten Dunst, American actress
 Drew Seeley, Canadian actor, singer-songwriter and dancer

May 

 May 1
 Jamie Dornan, Northern Irish actor and model
 Tommy Robredo, Spanish tennis player
 Darijo Srna, Croatian soccer player
 May 3 – Rebecca Hall, British-American actress
 May 4 – Markus Rogan, Austrian swimmer
 May 5 – Teresa Portela, Spanish canoeist
 May 6 
 Miljan Mrdaković, Serbian footballer (d. 2020)
 Dilshod Nazarov, Tajikstani hammer thrower
 May 7 
 Ákos Buzsáky, Hungarian footballer
 Matt Gaetz, American politician
 May 8 – Mark Bedworth, English rugby union footballer
 May 9 – Rachel Boston, American actress
 May 10 – Adebayo Akinfenwa, English footballer
 May 11
 Cory Monteith, Canadian actor (d. 2013)
 Jonathan Jackson, American actor
 May 12 
 Donnie Nietes, Filipino boxer
 Anastasia Rodionova, Russian born-Australian tennis player
 May 13 – Oguchi Onyewu, American soccer player
 May 14 – Ai Shibata, Japanese swimmer
 May 15
 Layal Abboud, Lebanese singer
 Alexandra Breckenridge, American actress, voice actress, and photographer
 Veronica Campbell-Brown, Jamaican athlete
 Tatsuya Fujiwara, Japanese actor
 Jessica Sutta, American singer and dancer
 May 16 – Łukasz Kubot, Polish tennis player
 May 17 
 Vjosa Osmani, 5th President of Kosovo
 Tony Parker, French basketball player
 May 19 – Kevin Amankwaah, English footballer
 May 20
 Petr Čech, Czech footballer
 Jessica Raine, English actress
 Lee Ryol-li, Korean-Japanese boxer
 May 22
 Hong Yong-jo, North Korean footballer
 Apolo Ohno, American short track speed skater and actor
 May 24 
 Paul Joseph Watson, British right-wing YouTuber, radio host, writer and conspiracy theorist
 May 25
 Justin Hodges, Australian rugby league player 
 Alexandr Ivanov, Russian javelin thrower
 Ezekiel Kemboi, Kenyan athlete
 May 28 – Alexa Davalos, American actress
 May 29
 Ana Beatriz Barros, Brazilian model
 Anita Briem, Icelandic actress

June

 June 1 – Justine Henin, Belgian tennis player
 June 2 – Jewel Staite, Canadian actress
 June 3 
 Gaetano D'Agostino, Italian football player and coach
 Yelena Isinbayeva, Russian athlete
 June 4 – MC Jin, American rapper
 June 5 
 Achille Emaná, Cameroonian footballer
 Zvjezdan Misimović, Bosnian footballer
 June 8 – Nadia Petrova, Russian tennis player
 June 10
 Laleh, Swedish singer-songwriter
 Tara Lipinski, American figure skater
 Princess Madeleine of Sweden
 June 11
 Eldar Rønning, Norwegian cross-country skier
 Diana Taurasi, American basketball player
 June 12 – Jason David, American football player
 June 13 – Kenenisa Bekele, Ethiopian long-distance runner
 June 14
 Jamie Green, English racing driver
 Lang Lang, Chinese pianist
 June 17 – Jodie Whittaker, English actress
 June 18 – Marco Borriello, Italian football player
 June 20 
 Example, British musician
 April Ross, American beach volleyball player
 June 21
 William, Prince of Wales, heir to the British throne
 Danny Buijs, Dutch football manager and former player
 June 22 – Soraia Chaves, Portuguese actress and model
 June 23
 Joona Puhakka, Finnish diver
 Denys Shelikhov, Ukrainian football player
 June 24
 Natasa Dusev-Janics, Serbian-Hungarian sprint canoeist
 Joanna Kulig, Polish actress and singer
 Kevin Nolan, English professional footballer
 June 25
 Rain, South Korean singer-songwriter, actor, and music producer
 Ryan Block, American technology entrepreneur
 Mikhail Youzhny, Russian tennis player
 Cécile Cassel, French actress and singer
 June 28
 Jung Gyu-woon, South Korean actor
 Grazi Massafera, Brazilian actress and model
 June 29
 Lily Rabe, American actress
 Kwon Yul, South Korean actor
 June 30
 Lizzy Caplan, American actress
 Ashley Walters, British rapper, songwriter and actor
 Büşra Pekin, Turkish actress

July 

 July 1
 Hilarie Burton, American actress and businesswoman
 Russell Holmes, American volleyball player
 Johann Tschopp, Swiss mountain bike racer
 Cat Zingano, American mixed martial artist
 July 2 – Beste Bereket, Turkish actress
 July 3 – Kanika, Indian actress and singer
 July 4
 Michael Sorrentino, American model, actor, and author
 Antonio Reguero, Spanish footballer
 Zoran Ljubinković, Serbian footballer
 July 5
 Tuba Büyüküstün, Turkish actress
 Philippe Gilbert, Belgian cyclist
 Alberto Gilardino, Italian football manager
 Beno Udrih, Slovenian basketball player
 July 7 
 Marcelo Calero, Brazilian diplomat and politician
 Jan Laštůvka, Czech footballer
 Rosana, Brazilian footballer
 July 8
 Sophia Bush, American actress
 Miguel Thiré, Brazilian actor
 July 9
 Slaine Kelly, Irish actress
 Sidão, Brazilian volleyball player
 Toby Kebbell, English actor
 July 11 – Max Rhyser, Danish-American-Israeli model, stage, television, and film actor
 July 12 – Antonio Cassano, Italian footballer
 July 13
 Shin-Soo Choo, South Korean baseball player
 Yadier Molina, Puerto Rican baseball player
 July 15 – Maksym Khvorost, Ukrainian épée fencer
 July 16 
 Steve Hooker, Australian pole vaulter 
 Carli Lloyd, American soccer player
 Aamna Sharif, Indian actress 
 Kellie Wells, American athlete
 July 18
 Ryan Cabrera, Colombian-American pop rock musician
 Priyanka Chopra, Indian actress and beauty queen
 Carlo Costly, Honduran footballer
 July 19 
 Jared Padalecki, American actor
 Lý Nhã Kỳ, Vietnamese actress, model and businesswoman
 July 22 – Lafaele Moala, Tongan footballer
 July 23 – Paul Wesley, American actor
 July 24
 Elisabeth Moss, American actress
 Anna Paquin, Canadian-born New Zealand actress
 July 25 
 Jared Golden, American politician
 Brad Renfro, American actor (d. 2008)
 July 27 
 Gévrise Émane, Cameroonian born-French judoka
 Wolé Parks, American actor
 July 29
 Prince Azim of Brunei, Brunei royal and film producer (d. 2020)
 Allison Mack, German-American actress
 July 30
 James Anderson, English cricketer
 Nesrin Cavadzade, Azerbaijani-Turkish actress
 Yvonne Strahovski, Australian actress
 July 31 
 Marc López, Spanish tennis player
 Anabel Medina Garrigues, Spanish tennis player and coach

August 

 

 
 

 August 2 – Hélder Postiga, Portuguese footballer
 August 5 – Lolo Jones, American track and field athlete
 August 6 – Romola Garai, English actress
 August 7
 Brit Marling, American actress
 Yana Klochkova, Ukrainian swimmer
 Marco Melandri, Italian motorcycle racer
 Abbie Cornish, Australian actress and rapper
 August 9 – Tyson Gay, American athlete
 August 10
 Devon Aoki, American supermodel and actress
 Şennur Demir, Turkish kickboxer
 Shaun Murphy, English snooker player
 August 12 – Jon Olsson, Swedish freestyle skier
 August 13
 Shani Davis, American speed skater
 Gary McSheffrey, English footballer
 Sarah Huckabee Sanders, American political consultant and press secretary
 Sebastian Stan, Romanian-American actor
 August 16 – Joleon Lescott, English footballer
 August 17
 Jon Olsson, Swedish freestyle skier
 Mark Salling, American actor (d. 2018)
 August 19
 Melissa Fumero, American actress
 Stipe Miocic, American mixed martial artist
 Erika Christensen, American actress and singer
 August 20 
 Arisa, Italian singer and actress
 Mijaín López, Cuban Greco-Roman wrestler
 Meghan Ory, Canadian actress
 August 23 – Natalie Coughlin, American Olympic swimmer
 August 24 – Kim Källström, Swedish footballer
 August 25 
 Benjamin Diskin, American actor and voice actor
 Jung Jae-sung, South Korean badminton player (d. 2018)
 August 26 
 Nikolay Apalikov, Russian volleyball player
 Priscilla Lopes-Schliep, Canadian hurdler
 August 27 – Bergüzar Korel, Turkish actress
 August 28 
 Thiago Motta, Brazilian born-Italian football player and coach
 LeAnn Rimes, American country singer
 August 29 
 Marina Aleksandrova, Russian actress
 Carlos Delfino, Argentine basketball player
 Vincent Enyeama, Nigerian football goalkeeper
 August 30 
 Alina Dumitru, Romanian judoka
 Andy Roddick, American tennis player
 August 31 
 Ian Crocker, American Olympic swimmer
 José Manuel Reina Páez, Spanish footballer

September 

 September 1 – Jeffrey Buttle, Canadian figure skater
 September 3 – Sarah Burke, Canadian freestyle skier (d. 2012)
 September 7 – Emese Szász-Kovács, Hungarian fencer
 September 9 – Ai Otsuka, Japanese singer, songwriter, pianist and actress
 September 10
 Misty Copeland, American ballet dancer
 Bret Iwan, American voice actor
 Naldo, Brazilian footballer
 September 11 
 Elvan Abeylegesse, Ethiopian born-Turkish long distance runner
 Shriya Saran, Indian actress
 September 12
 Isabelle Caro, French model and actress (d. 2010)
 Max Hoff, German sprint canoeist
 September 13 
 Soraya Arnelas, Spanish singer
 Nenê, Brazilian basketball player
 September 16 – Leon Britton, English footballer
 September 19 – Skepta, English MC and record producer
September 21 - Dominic Perrottet, Australian politician, Premier of New South Wales
 September 22
Masud Gharahkhani, Iranian-Norwegian politician, President of the Storting
 Kosuke Kitajima, Japanese swimmer
 Billie Piper, English actress and singer
 September 23 – Alyssa Sutherland, Australian actress and model
 September 25 – Hyun Bin, Korean actor
 Maarten Stekelenburg, Dutch footballer
 September 26 – Betty Sun, Chinese actress
 September 27
 Anna Camp, American actress
 Markus Rosenberg, Swedish footballer
 Abhinav Shukla, Indian actor and model
 Lil Wayne, African-American rapper
 September 28
 Abhinav Bindra, Indian shooter
 Ranbir Kapoor, Indian actor
 Emeka Okafor, American basketball player
 Anderson Varejão, American basketball player
 St. Vincent, American singer, songwriter and multi-instrumentalist
 September 29 – Amy Williams, British Olympic medallist
 September 30
 Lacey Chabert, American actress
 Li Xiaolu, Chinese actress

October 

 

 October 2 – Tyson Chandler, American basketball player
 October 3 –  Server Djeparov, Uzbek footballer
 October 4 – Ilhan Omar, Somali born-American politician
 October 5 – Zhang Yining, Chinese table tennis player
 October 6 – Levon Aronian, Armenian chess Grandmaster
 October 7
 Madjid Bougherra, Algerian footballer
 Jermain Defoe, English footballer
 Li Yundi, Chinese pianist
 October 8
 Princess Siribhachudabhorn of Thailand
 Annemiek van Vleuten, Dutch road bicycle racer
 October 9 – Travis Rice, American snowboarder
 October 10 
David Cal, Spanish sprint canoeist
Dan Stevens, English actor
 October 13 – Ian Thorpe, Australian swimmer
 October 15
Imran Abbas Naqvi, Pakistani Actor/Model/Singer
 Saif Saaeed Shaheen, Qatarian athlete
 Kirsten Wild, Dutch racing cyclist
 October 16 – Svetlana Loboda, Ukrainian singer and composer
 October 19 – Louis Oosthuizen, South African golfer
 October 20 – Johan Lora, Dominican international footballer
 October 21 – Lee Chong Wei, Malaysian badminton player
 October 26 
 Nicola Adams, English boxer
 Matt Smith, English actor
 October 28 – Özge Ulusoy, Turkish actress, model and ballerina
 October 30 
 Jon Foo, English actor and martial artist
 Clémence Poésy, French actress and fashion model

November 

 November 2 – Kyoko Fukada, Japanese actress and singer
 November 3
 Pekka Rinne, Finnish ice hockey goaltender
 November 4 – Kamila Skolimowska, Polish hammer thrower (d. 2009)
 Evgeni Plushenko, Russian figure skater
 November 8
 Ted DiBiase, American professional wrestler and actor
 Francesco Molinari, Italian golfer
 November 9 
Derek Muller, Australian-Canadian science communicator and filmmaker
Jana Pittman, Australian athlete
 November 10 – Ruth Lorenzo, Spanish singer and composer
 November 12 – Anne Hathaway, American actress
 November 13 – Kumi Koda, Japanese singer
 November 16 – Amar'e Stoudemire, American professional basketball player
 November 18 
 Marlène Schiappa, French politician
 Damon Wayans, Jr., American actor and comedian
 November 19 – Shin Dong-hyuk, North Korean defector and human rights activist
 November 21
 Ioana Ciolacu, Romanian fashion designer
 Nadia Buari, Ghana Movie Actress
 November 22 
 Steve Angello, Greek-Swedish DJ and producer
 Charlene Choi, Hong Kong singer and actress
 November 23 – Asafa Powell, Jamaican sprinter
 November 24 – Mary Kom, Indian boxer
 November 25 – Minna Kauppi, Finnish orienteer
 November 27 – Aleksandr Kerzhakov, Russian soccer player
 November 28 – Steve Mullings, Jamaican athlete
 November 29
 Lucas Black, American actor
 Gemma Chan, British film actress
 John Mensah, Ghanaian footballer
 November 30 – Elisha Cuthbert, Canadian actress

December 

 December 1 – Riz Ahmed, British actor, rapper, and activist
 December 3 – Michael Essien, Ghanaian footballer
 December 5
 Keri Hilson, American R&B singer 
 Gabriel Luna, American actor
 Ján Mucha, Slovak footballer
 December 6 – Alberto Contador, Spanish cyclist
 December 8 
 Halil Altıntop, German born-Turkish footballer
 Hamit Altıntop, German born-Turkish footballer
 Nicki Minaj, American rapper and singer
 December 9
 Tamilla Abassova, Russian cyclist
 Nathalie De Vos, Belgian athlete
 December 13 – Elisa Di Francisca, Italian fencer
 December 15 – Charlie Cox, English actor 
 December 16 
 Anna Sedokova, Ukrainian singer, actress and television presenter
 Stanislav Šesták, Slovak footballer
 December 17 – Dynamo, British magician
 December 19 – Tero Pitkämäki, Finnish javelin thrower
 December 21
 Mandy Wong, Hong Kong actress
 Tom Payne, English actor
 December 22 
 Agbani Darego, Nigerian model and beauty queen
 Britta Heidemann, German fencer
 December 26 – Aksel Lund Svindal, Norwegian alpine skier
 December 28 – Beau Garrett, American actress and model
 December 29 – Alison Brie, American actress
 December 30 – Kristin Kreuk, Canadian actress

Date unknown 
 Katharina Mückstein, Austrian film director
 Ramzi Ben Sliman, French film director

Deaths

January

 January 1 – Victor Buono, American actor (b. 1938)
 January 3 – Erwin Canham, journalist (b. 1904)
 January 5 – Hans Conried, American actor (b. 1917)
 January 7 – Kay Hammond, American actress (b. 1901)
 January 8 
 Reta Shaw, American actress (b. 1912)
 Grégoire Aslan, Armenian actor (b. 1908)
 January 11
A. W. Haydon, American inventor (b. 1906)
Jiro Horikoshi, Japanese aircraft designer (b. 1903)
Paul Lynde, American actor and comedian (b. 1926)
 January 13 – Marcel Camus, French film director (b. 1912)
 January 18 – Juan O'Gorman, Mexican painter and architect (b. 1905)
 January 19 – Elis Regina, Brazilian singer (b. 1945)
 January 22 – Eduardo Frei Montalva, 27th President of Chile (b. 1911)
 January 24 – Alfredo Ovando Candía, Bolivian military officer, 48th President of Bolivia (b. 1918)
 January 25 – Mikhail Suslov, senior Soviet Communist Party official (b. 1902)
 January 27 – Trần Văn Hương, 3rd President of the Republic of Vietnam (South Vietnam) and 3rd Prime Minister of South Vietnam (b. 1902)
 January 30
 Stanley Holloway, British actor (b. 1890)
 Lightnin' Hopkins, American blues musician (b. 1912)
 Helen Lynd, American sociologist and philosopher (b. 1896)

February

 February 3, Efraín Huerta, Mexican poet and journalist (b. 1914)
 February 4
 Sue Carol, American actress (b. 1906)
 Alex Harvey, Scottish musician (b. 1935)
 February 5 – Neil Aggett, South African labor leader (suicide) (b. 1953)
 February 6
 Ioan Beldiceanu, Romanian general (b. 1892)
 Ben Nicholson, English painter (b. 1894)
 February 11
 Eleanor Powell, American dancer and actress (b. 1912)
 Takashi Shimura, Japanese actor (b. 1905)
 February 12 – Victor Jory, Canadian actor (b. 1902)
 February 17
 Thelonious Monk, American jazz pianist (b. 1917)
 Lee Strasberg, Polish-American actor and acting coach, co-founder of method acting (b. 1901)
 February 18 – Dame Ngaio Marsh, New Zealand crime fiction writer (b. 1895)
 February 19 – Dame Margery Perham, English Africanist (b. 1895)
 February 21 – Gershom Scholem, German-born Israeli Jewish philosopher and historian (b. 1897)
 February 24 – Virginia Bruce, American actress (b. 1910)

March

 March 2 – Philip K. Dick, American author (b. 1928)
 March 3 – Georges Perec, French novelist, filmmaker, documentalist, and essayist. (b. 1936)
 March 5 – John Belushi, American comedian, actor and singer (b. 1949)
 March 6 – Ayn Rand, Russian-born author (b. 1905)
 March 8
 Rab Butler, British statesman (b. 1902)
 Hatem Ali Jamadar, Bengali politician (b. 1872)
 March 19 – Randy Rhoads, American guitarist for Ozzy Osbourne (b. 1956)
 March 21 – Harry H. Corbett, English actor and comedian (b. 1925)
 March 22 – Pericle Felici, Italian Roman Catholic cardinal (b. 1911)
 March 26
 Sultan al-Atrash, Syrian nationalist and general (b. 1891)
 Sam Kydd, Irish-born English actor (b. 1915)
 March 27 – Fazlur Rahman Khan, Bangladeshi-born American architect (b. 1929)
 March 28 – William Giauque, Canadian chemist, Nobel Prize laureate (b. 1895)
 March 29 
 Carl Orff, German composer (b. 1895)
 Walter Hallstein, German diplomat, 1st President of the European Commission (b. 1901)
 Helene Deutsch, Polish-American psychoanalyst (b. 1884)

April

 April 3 – Warren Oates, American actor (b. 1928)
 April 5 – Abe Fortas, U.S. Supreme Court Justice (b. 1910)
 April 9 – Robert Havemann, chemist and East German dissident (b. 1910)
 April 12 – Lenny Baker, American actor (b. 1945)
 April 15
 Riccardo Billi, Italian actor (b. 1906)
 Arthur Lowe, British actor (b. 1915)
 April 20 – Archibald MacLeish, American poet (b. 1892)
 April 24 – Ville Ritola, Finnish Olympic athlete (b. 1896)
 April 25
Boris Andreyev, Soviet and Russian actor (b. 1915)
 Celia Johnson, British actress (b. 1908)
 April 29
 Kassim Al-Rimawi, 52nd Prime Minister of Jordan (b. 1918)
 Elmer Ripley, American basketball coach (b. 1891)

May

 May 1
 Hussein ibn Nasser, 36th Prime Minister of Jordan (b. 1902)
 William Primrose, Scottish violist (b. 1903)
 May 3 – Mohammed Seddik Benyahia, Algerian politician (b. 1898)
 May 8
 Salomea Andronikova, Georgian-Russian socialite (b. 1888)
 Gilles Villeneuve, Canadian race car driver (racing accident) (b. 1950)
 May 10 – Peter Weiss, German writer and artist (b. 1916)
 May 12 – Humphrey Searle, English composer (b. 1915)
 May 13
 Aleksandr Borisov, Soviet and Russian actor (b. 1905)
 Renzo Rossellini, Italian composer (b. 1908)
 May 14 – Hugh Beaumont, American actor (b. 1909)
 May 15 – Gordon Smiley, American race car driver (racing accident) (b. 1946)
 May 22 – Cevdet Sunay, Turkish army officer and political leader, 5th President of Turkey (b. 1899)
 May 24 – Stanisława Perzanowska, Polish actress (b. 1898)
 May 26 – Guillermo Flores Avendaño, acting President of Guatemala (b. 1894)
 May 28 – Lt Col H. Jones, VC, British soldier (Falklands War) (b. 1940)
 May 29 – Romy Schneider, German-French actress (b. 1938)
 May 30 – Albert Norden, German politician (b. 1904)

June

 June 2 
 Fazal Ilahi Chaudhry, Pakistani politician, 5th President of Pakistan (b. 1904)
 Shah Abd al-Wahhab, Bangladeshi Islamic scholar (b. 1894)
 June 8 – Satchel Paige, American Negro league baseball player and a member of the MLB Hall of Fame (b. 1906)
 June 9 – Mirza Nasir Ahmad, 3rd Caliph of Ahmadiyya Muslim Community in Islam (b. 1909)
 June 10 
 Rainer Werner Fassbinder, German film director, screenwriter and actor (b. 1945)
 Gala Dalí, Russian-Spanish muse, wife of Paul Éluard and Salvador Dalí (b. 1894)
 June 11
Santosh Kumar, Pakistani actor (b. 1925)
 H. Radclyffe Roberts, American entomologist (b. 1906) 
Anatoly Solonitsyn, Soviet and Russian actor (b. 1934)
 June 12
 Karl von Frisch, Austrian zoologist, recipient of the Nobel Prize in Physiology or Medicine (b. 1886)
 Marie Rambert, Polish-English dancer and pedagogue (b. 1888)
 June 13
 King Khalid of Saudi Arabia (b. 1913)
 Riccardo Paletti, Italian Formula 1 driver (racing accident) (b. 1958)
 June 17 – Roberto Calvi, Italian banker (b. 1920)
 June 18
 Djuna Barnes, American novelist (b. 1892)
 John Cheever, American novelist and short story writer (b. 1912)
 Curd Jürgens, German actor (b. 1915)
 June 25 – Edward Hamm, American Olympic athlete (b. 1906)
 June 29
 Pierre Balmain, French fashion designer (b. 1914)
 Michael Brennan, British actor (b. 1912)
 Henry King, American film director (b. 1886)

July

 July 1 – Jacobo Palm, Curaçao born composer (b. 1887)
 July 4 
 Terry Higgins, early British casualty of AIDS (b. 1945) 
 Antonio Guzmán Fernández, Dominican businessman and politician, 46th President of the Dominican Republic (b. 1911)
 July 6 – Alma Reville, English screenwriter (b. 1899)
 July 7 – Bon Maharaja, Indian guru and religious writer (b. 1901)
 July 8
 Gunnar Eriksson, Swedish Olympic cross-country skier (b. 1921)
 Isa Miranda, Italian actress (b. 1905)
 Albert White, American Olympic diver (b. 1895)
 Virginia Hall, American spy (b. 1906)
 July 10 – Maria Jeritza, Czechoslovak soprano (b. 1887)
 July 11 – Susan Littler, British actress (b. 1948)
 July 12 – Kenneth More, English actor (b. 1914)
 July 16
 Charles Robberts Swart, last Governor-General and 4th President of South Africa (b. 1894)
 Patrick Dewaere, French actor (b. 1947)
 July 18
 Roman Jakobson, Russian-American linguist and literary theorist (b. 1896)
 Quirico Pignalberi, Italian Roman Catholic priest and venerable (b. 1891)
 July 19 – Hugh Everett III, American physicist (b. 1930)
 July 23 – Vic Morrow, American actor and director (b. 1929)
 July 26 – Teresa Iżewska, Polish actress (b. 1933)
 July 28 – Vladimir Smirnov, Soviet fencer (b. 1954)
 July 29 – Vladimir Zworykin, Russian-born inventor (b. 1889)

August

 August 1 – T. Thirunavukarasu, Sri Lankan Tamil politician (b. 1933)
 August 2 – Cathleen Nesbitt, British actress (b. 1888)
 August 6 – S. K. Pottekkatt, Indian writer (b. 1913)
 August 12
 Henry Fonda, American actor (b. 1905)
 Tomás Romero Pereira, 41st President of Paraguay (b. 1886)
 Salvador Sánchez, Mexican boxer (b. 1959)
 August 13 – Charles Walters, American film director (b. 1911)
 August 15 – Hugo Theorell, Swedish scientist, recipient of the Nobel Prize in Physiology or Medicine (b. 1903)
 August 18 – Beverly Bayne, American actress (b. 1894)
 August 20
 Ulla Jacobsson, Swedish actress (b. 1929)
 Edward Ludwig, Russian-born American director (b. 1899)
 George David Woods, American banker, 4th President of the World Bank (b. 1901)
 August 21 – King Sobhuza II of Swaziland (b. 1899)
 August 23
 Alberto Cavalcanti, Brazilian film director (b. 1897)
 Stanford Moore, American biochemist, Nobel Prize laureate (b. 1913)
 August 25 – Anna German, Polish singer (b. 1936)
 August 27 – Anandamayi Ma, Indian spiritual leader (b. 1896)
 August 29 – Ingrid Bergman, Swedish actress (b. 1915)

September

 September 1
 Isabel Cristina Mrad Campos, Young Brazilian victim of feminicide declared blessed by Roman Catholicism (b. 1962)
 Władysław Gomułka, Polish Communist politician, former First Secretary of the Polish United Workers' Party (b. 1905)
 Ludwig Bieberbach, German mathematician (b. 1886)
 September 2
 Tom Baker, American actor (b. 1940)
 Jay Novello, American actor (b. 1904)
 September 3 – Carlo Alberto Dalla Chiesa, Italian general (assassinated) (b. 1920)
 September 4 – Jack Tworkov, American painter (b. 1900)
 September 5 – Sir Douglas Bader, British fighter pilot and inspirational leader during the Battle of Britain (b. 1910)
 September 7 – Ken Boyer, American baseball player (St. Louis Cardinals) (b. 1931)
 September 11
 Wifredo Lam, Cuban artist (b. 1902)
 Jovan Miladinović, Serbian footballer (b. 1939)
 September 12 – Federico Moreno Torroba, Spanish composer and conductor (b. 1891)
 September 14
 Bachir Gemayel, President-elect of Lebanon (b. 1947)
 Grace Kelly, American actress; Princess of Monaco (b. 1929)
 September 16 – Rolfe Sedan, American actor (b. 1896)
 September 17 – Kristján Eldjárn, 3rd President of Iceland (b. 1916)
 September 19 – Ted Badcock, New Zealand cricketer (b. 1897)
 September 21 – Ivan Bagramyan, Soviet and Armenian military commander and Marshal of the Soviet Union (b. 1897)
 September 24 – Sarah Churchill, British actress, daughter of Winston Churchill (b. 1914)
 September 28 – Mabel Albertson, American actress (b. 1901)

October

 October 3 – Vivien Merchant, British actress (b. 1929)
 October 4
 Ahmad Hassan al-Bakr, 25th Prime Minister of Iraq and 4th President of Iraq (b. 1914)
 Criswell, American psychic, entertainer (b. 1907)
 Glenn Gould, Canadian pianist (b. 1932)
 Leroy Grumman, American aeronautical engineer, test pilot, and industrialist. (b. 1895)
 Stefanos Stefanopoulos, Greek politician, Prime Minister of Greece (b. 1898)
 October 5 – François Simon, Swiss actor (b. 1917)
 October 8
 Philip Noel-Baker, Canadian-born peace activist; recipient of the Nobel Peace Prize (b. 1889)
 Fernando Lamas, Argentine-born actor (b. 1916)
 October 9
 Anna Freud, Austrian psychoanalyst (b. 1895)
 Herbert Meinhard Mühlpfordt, German historian (b. 1893)
 October 10 – Jean Effel, French painter and journalist (b. 1908)
 October 16 – Hans Selye, Canadian endocrinologist (b. 1907)
 October 18
 Bess Truman, First Lady of the United States (b. 1885)
 Dwain Esper, American director (b. 1892)
 Pierre Mendès France, French politician, 93rd Prime Minister of France (b. 1907)
 October 20 – Jimmy McGrory, Scottish football player and manager (b. 1904)
 October 21 – Sylvia Lance Harper, Australian tennis player (b. 1895)
 October 22 – Savitri Devi, French-born writer and philosopher (b. 1905)
 October 25 – Arvid Wallman, Swedish diver (b. 1901)
 October 26 – Giovanni Benelli, Italian Roman Catholic cardinal (b. 1921)
 October 27 – Miguel Ydígoras Fuentes, Guatemalan general, 21st President of Guatemala (b. 1895)
 October 29 – William Lloyd Webber, British organist and composer (b. 1914)
 October 30 – Wolfgang Heinz, German actor (b. 1900)
 October 31 – Dick Merrill, American aviation pioneer (b. 1894)

November

 November 1
 James Broderick, American actor (b. 1927)
 King Vidor, American film director (b. 1894)
 November 4 – Dominique Dunne, American actress (b. 1959)
 November 5 – Jacques Tati, French filmmaker (b. 1907)
 November 10 
 Leonid Brezhnev, Soviet statesman, General Secretary of the Communist Party of the Soviet Union and Chairman of the Presidium of the Supreme Soviet (b. 1906)
 Elio Petri, Italian filmmaker (b. 1929)
 November 11 – S. A. Ashokan, Tamil actor (b. 1931)
 November 12
 Dorothy Round Little, English tennis champion (b. 1908)
 Patrick Cowley, American disco and Hi-NRG dance music composer and recording artist (b. 1950)
 November 13 – Chesney Allen, British entertainer and comedian (b. 1894)
 November 15
 Vinoba Bhave, Indian educator (b. 1895)
 Dick Randall, Australian public servant (b. 1906)
 November 16 – Peter Forster, British actor (b. 1920)
 November 17
 Ruth Donnelly, American actress (b. 1896)
 Duk Koo Kim, South Korean boxer (b. 1955)
 Eduard Tubin, Estonian composer (b. 1905)
 November 19 – Erving Goffman, Canadian-American sociologist and psychologist (b. 1922)
 November 21 – Lee Patrick, American actress (b. 1901)
 November 22
 Jean Batten, New Zealand aviator (b. 1909)
 Stanisław Ostrowski, Polish politician, 3rd President of Poland in exile (b. 1892)
 November 23
 Benny Friedman, American football player (Brooklyn Dodgers) and a member of the Pro Football Hall of Fame (b. 1905)
 Grady Nutt, American humorist (b. 1934)
 November 24 – Barack Obama Sr., Kenyan economist (b. 1934)
 November 25 – Hugh Harman, American cartoon animator (b. 1903)
 November 26 – Juhan Aavik, Estonian composer (b. 1884)
 November 27 – Steve Gordon, American filmmaker (b. 1938)
 November 28 – Helen of Greece and Denmark, Queen Mother of Romania (b. 1896)
 November 29
 Hermann Balck, German general (b. 1893)
 Percy Williams, Canadian athlete (b. 1908)
 November 30 
 Rosario Riccobono, Italian gangster (b. 1929)
 Aldo Vidussoni, Italian lawyer and Fascist politician (b. 1914)

December

 December 2 – Marty Feldman, British comedian and writer (b. 1934)
 December 7 – Will Lee, American actor who played Mr. Hooper on Sesame Street (b. 1908)
 December 8
 Encarnación Fuyola, Spanish teacher and activist (b. 1907)
 Marty Robbins, American singer, songwriter and racing driver (b. 1925)
 December 10 – Freeman Fisher Gosden, American actor (b. 1899)
 December 15 – Prince Adalberto, Duke of Bergamo (b. 1898)
 December 16 – Colin Chapman, British designer, inventor and builder in the automotive industry (b. 1928)
 December 17 – Homer S. Ferguson, American politician (b. 1889)
 December 18 – Hans-Ulrich Rudel, German World War II dive bomber pilot (b. 1916)
 December 20 – Arthur Rubinstein, Polish-born pianist and conductor (b. 1887)
 December 21
 Charles Hapgood, American college professor (b. 1904)
 Gladys Henson, Irish actress (b. 1897)
 December 23 – Jack Webb, American actor (b. 1920)
 December 24 – Louis Aragon, French poet and writer (b. 1897)
 December 25 – Helen Foster, American actress (b. 1906)
 December 27 – Jack Swigert, American astronaut (b. 1931)
 December 28 – Arthur Hughes, American actor (b. 1894)
 December 30 – Giuseppe Aquari, Italian cinematographer (b. 1916)
 December 31
 John Collins, British Anglican priest and venerable (b. 1905)
 Kurt Otto Friedrichs, German-born American mathematician (b. 1901)

Date unknown 
 Corneliu Carp, Romanian general (b. 1895)

Nobel Prizes 

 Physics – Kenneth G. Wilson
 Chemistry – Aaron Klug
 Medicine – Sune K. Bergström, Bengt I. Samuelsson, John R. Vane
 Literature – Gabriel García Márquez
 Peace – Alva Myrdal, Alfonso García Robles
 Economics – George Stigler

Fields Medal 
 Alain Connes, William Thurston, Shing-Tung Yau

References

External links
Chronology of major events — 1982 - UPI Archives - UPI.com